Kelkheim, officially "Kelkheim (Taunus)", is a town in the Main-Taunus district in Hesse, Germany, close to Germany's financial center Frankfurt/Main.

Geography

Location
Located on the southwestern slopes of the Taunus mountains, Kelkheim is noted for its attractive scenery. Kelkheim is located approximately 10 km to the west of Frankfurt. Wiesbaden, the state capital of Hesse, is about 25 km away, while the Mainz, the state capital of Rhineland-Palatinate, is about 30 km away.

Town districts
Kelkheim is subdivided into six boroughs Kelkheim-Mitte, Münster, Hornau, Fischbach, Ruppertshain and Eppenhain.

Twin towns – sister cities

Kelkheim is twinned with:
 High Wycombe, England, United Kingdom (1985)
 Saint-Fons, France (1971)

Public transportation
Kelkheim station is connected to both Frankfurt and Königstein by rail, while bus connections exist to Eppstein, Königstein, Liederbach and Sulzbach. Frankfurt Airport serves as the city's main international airport and is located near to Kelkheim.

References

External links

  
 
 

Towns in Hesse
Main-Taunus-Kreis